David Andrew Bargh (born 14 March 1962) is a former speedway rider from New Zealand.

Speedway career 
Bargh is a four times champion of New Zealand, winning the New Zealand Championship in 1986, 1987, 1991 and 2000.  He was runner up in the European Speedway Under 21 Championship in 1983.

He rode in the top tier of British Speedway from 1978 until 1991, riding primarily for the Newcastle Diamonds.

World Final appearances

World Pairs Championship
 1992 -  Lonigo, Pista Speedway (with Mitch Shirra / Mark Thorpe) - 6th - 14pts

Family
His nephew Andrew Bargh was a New Zealand champion in 2007.

References 

1962 births
Living people
New Zealand speedway riders
Belle Vue Aces riders
Coventry Bees riders
Hull Vikings riders
Newcastle Diamonds riders
Sheffield Tigers riders